Youghiogheny Bank of Pennsylvania, also known as Old State Bank, is a historic bank building located at Perryopolis, Fayette County, Pennsylvania. It was built in about 1817, and is a one-story, square sandstone building.  It measures 25 feet square and has a gable roof.  A two-story, rear stone addition was added in about 1935.  It was built as a bank and in use as such until 1819.  Afterwards, it was used as a school, Methodist church, store, post office, pool room, fruit stand, restaurant, and medical office.  It now houses a museum operated by the Perryopolis Area Heritage Society.

It was added to the National Register of Historic Places in 1997.

References

History museums in Pennsylvania
Bank buildings on the National Register of Historic Places in Pennsylvania
Commercial buildings completed in 1817
Buildings and structures in Fayette County, Pennsylvania
National Register of Historic Places in Fayette County, Pennsylvania